Asteroideae is a subfamily of the plant family Asteraceae. It contains about 70% of the species of the family. It consists of several tribes, including Astereae, Calenduleae, Eupatorieae, Gnaphalieae, Heliantheae, Senecioneae and Tageteae. Asteroideae contains plants found all over the world, many of which are shrubby. There are about 1,135 genera and 17,200 species within this subfamily; the largest genera by number of species are Helichrysum (500–600) and Artemisia (550).

Asteroideae is said to date back to approximately 46–36.5 million years ago.

Common characteristics 
This family will often have radiate style heads but some could have discoid or disciform. They contain ray florets that are three lobed and are also considered perfect flower implying that it is bisexual. Many contain stigmatic surfaces that are separated by two marginal bands and terminal sterile appendages with sweeping hairs.

Taxonomy 
This subfamily is composed of 21 tribes that are broken into 3 supertribes: Senecionodae, Asterodae, and Helianthodae.  Senecioneae contains about 120 genera and more than 3,200 species that are found in more temperate areas. Asterodae contains many economically important plants such as the chrysanthemums, common daisy, and the asters. The third super tribe is the Helianthodae, which is the largest of the three, containing 16 of the 21 tribes.

Since 2004, the 21 tribes have been grouped into three supertribes:

 Senecionodae
 Senecioneae (Doronicum is sometimes placed in a separate tribe Doroniceae)
  Asterodae
 Anthemideae (including chrysanthemums)
 Astereae (including asters and the common daisy)
 Calenduleae (including calendulas)
 Gnaphalieae
  Helianthodae
 Athroismeae
 Bahieae
 Chaenactideae
 Coreopsideae (including cosmos and dahlias)
 Eupatorieae
 Feddeeae
 Helenieae (including gaillardias)
 Heliantheae (including sunflowers and zinnias)
 Inuleae (including Plucheeae)
 Madieae
 Millerieae
 Neurolaeneae
 Perityleae
 Polymnieae
 Tageteae (including marigolds)

Uses
The subfamily Asteroideae has many genera within the tribes that have economic uses. Helianthus tuberosus (Jerusalem artichoke), Helianthus annuus (sunflower) and Guizotia abyssinica (niger seed) are all used as oil seed crops. Artemisia dracunculus (tarragon) is used as a culinary herb and Parthenium argentatum (guayule) is a rubber source. Some of the other genera are used as ornamentals; those are Dendranthema spp. (chrysanthemum), Callistephus, Cosmos, Tagetes (marigold), and many others.

References

External links

 
Asterales subfamilies